William Oliver Campbell (born July 7, 1959) is an American film and television actor. He first gained recognition for his recurring role as Luke Fuller in the TV series Dynasty. Then he became known for playing Rick Sammler on Once and Again, Det. Joey Indelli on Crime Story, Jordan Collier on The 4400, and Dr. Jon Fielding on the Tales of the City miniseries.  His most notable films include The Rocketeer, Bram Stoker's Dracula and Enough. He portrayed Darren Richmond on the AMC television series The Killing, Dr. Alan Farragut in the SYFY series Helix and Det. John Cardinal on CTV's Cardinal.

Early life
Campbell was born in Charlottesville, Virginia. He attended Fork Union Military Academy and Western Albemarle High School. His parents divorced when he was two years old.

Career

After an appearance in an episode of the hit 1980s sitcom Family Ties, Campbell's first prominent role was that of Luke Fuller, Steven Carrington's lover on Dynasty. Campbell appeared in the show's fifth season (1984–85) when Dynasty was the number one show on American television. Following this, he had a regular role as Detective Joey Indelli on the 1986–88 NBC series Crime Story. Campbell was the first choice of the producers of Star Trek: The Next Generation to play the role of William Riker, but lost the role to Jonathan Frakes. Campbell appeared as a guest star during the show's second season, portraying the title character in "The Outrageous Okona".

In 1991 Campbell played the lead role in The Rocketeer. He went on to appear as Quincey Morris, a vampire hunter in Bram Stoker's Dracula (1992). In 1993, he starred in the short-lived detective series Moon Over Miami, and won the role of Dr. Jon Fielding in the television adaptation of Tales of the City. He appeared in the sequels More Tales of the City in 1998, and Further Tales of the City in 2001.

In 1999 Campbell began his role as Rick Sammler on Once and Again, opposite Sela Ward. The series ran for three seasons until 2002, during which time Campbell received a Golden Globe nomination for Best Actor in a Dramatic Series. Campbell then had a regular role as Jordan Collier on the sci-fi series The 4400, which aired for four seasons on the USA Network between 2004–2007. In 2005, he had a recurring role in the teen soap The O.C.

After his role in the 2002 film Enough, in which he played the abusive husband of Jennifer Lopez's character, he portrayed serial killer Ted Bundy in the 2003 made-for-TV movie The Stranger Beside Me. He then played a college professor accused of raping a student in a 2004 episode of Law & Order: Special Victims Unit, and also played an accused serial killer who defends himself in the 2007 television series Shark. In 2010, Campbell had a recurring role in the short-lived revival of Melrose Place.  Following this, Campbell took a prominent role in the AMC series The Killing, an American remake of the Danish series of the same name.

In 2012 Campbell played the stern but kindly father in the independent film, Fat Kid Rules the World. In 2000, Campbell was named one of the "World's 50 Most Beautiful People" by People magazine. In 2013, he played Abraham Lincoln in the National Geographic television adaptation of the Bill O'Reilly/Martin Dugard book, Killing Lincoln.

From 2017 to 2020, he starred in the Canadian television drama series Cardinal, for which he won the Canadian Screen Award for Best Actor in a Limited Series or Television Film at the 6th Canadian Screen Awards in 2018, the 7th Canadian Screen Awards in 2019 and the 8th Canadian Screen Awards in 2020.

Personal life
By the end of filming of 1991's The Rocketeer, the 31-year-old Campbell was in a romance with his 20-year-old co-star Jennifer Connelly. They were engaged before they broke up in 1996 after being involved for five years. He now has a Norwegian wife and two children, and they live at her family's farm in Rygge (Moss since 1 January 2020), Norway. 

Campbell is a rugby enthusiast, having played for the Virginia Rugby Football Club, Chicago Lions RFC and the Santa Monica Rugby Club.

Campbell has "permanent resident" immigration status in Canada, with an apartment in Vancouver, British Columbia.
Also played Rugby with Chicago Griffins.

Filmography

Film

Television

See also
 List of Star Trek: The Next Generation actors

References

External links
 

1959 births
American male film actors
American male television actors
Living people
Male actors from Virginia
People from Charlottesville, Virginia
American emigrants to Canada
Best Actor in a Drama Series Canadian Screen Award winners